Vitaly Tomilin is a Russian ice hockey player. The second-best scorer for the Russian junior squad at the '93 IIHF World Junior Championships, Tomilin tallied two goals and added five assists in seven contests.  The New Jersey Devils drafted the 19-year-old centre with their fourth pick in the '92 entry draft.

References

External links

1974 births
Living people
People from Elektrostal
Russian ice hockey centres
Soviet ice hockey centres
Soviet Wings players
Krylya Sovetov Moscow players
New Jersey Devils draft picks
Amur Khabarovsk players
Sportspeople from Moscow Oblast